Leucoptera deltidias is a moth in the family Lyonetiidae that is endemic to Australia.

They probably mine the leaves of their host plant.

External links

Leucoptera (moth)
Moths described in 1906
Endemic fauna of Australia
Moths of Australia